Saybrook Township is one of the twenty-seven townships of Ashtabula County, Ohio, United States. The 2010 census found 9,853 people in the township.

Geography
Located on the northeastern edge of the county along Lake Erie, it borders the following townships:
Ashtabula Township - northeast
Plymouth Township - east
Jefferson Township - southeast corner
Austinburg Township - south
Harpersfield Township - southwest corner
Geneva Township - west

The Canadian province of Ontario lies across Lake Erie to the north.

Part of the city of Ashtabula is located in northeastern Saybrook Township, along the shoreline of Lake Erie. The census-designated place of Saybrook-on-the-Lake is in the northwest part of the township.

Name and history
Named for the Connecticut Saybrook Colony it is the only Saybrook Township statewide.

Saybrook Township was originally part of Austinburg Township and contained a settlement called Wrightsburg. It was not until 1816 that modern Saybrook Township became a separate township of its own. The township and community continued to be called Wrightsburg until 1827 when the name was changed to Saybrook, its new name coming from Saybrook, Connecticut. The early settlers are listed in the 1820 census for Ashtabula County with the township recorded as Wrightsburg.

The Saybrook Township lands were originally owned by Connecticut Land Company investor William Hart. Hart then sold the entire township, with the exception of one lot, to Josiah Wright and his son Samuel Wright of Pownal, Vermont, in 1811. The deed for this sale is recorded in the Ashtabula County Courthouse in Jefferson, Ohio.

Even though the Wrights were early owners of Saybrook Township, they were not the first settlers. The first settler in Saybrook Township was George Webster, a New Yorker who came in 1810.

In 1833, Saybrook Township contained one store, three taverns, a saw mill, and a carding machine.

Government
The township is governed by a three-member board of trustees, who are elected in November of odd-numbered years to a four-year term beginning on the following January 1. Two are elected in the year after the presidential election and one is elected in the year before it. There is also an elected township fiscal officer, who serves a four-year term beginning on April 1 of the year after the election, which is held in November of the year before the presidential election. Vacancies in the fiscal officership or on the board of trustees are filled by the remaining trustees.  Currently, the board is composed of chairman Norman Jepson and members Robert Brobst  and Tom Pope.

References

External links
Township website
County website

Townships in Ashtabula County, Ohio
Townships in Ohio
1816 establishments in Ohio
Populated places established in 1816